Olav Trygve Olsen-Bjørnstad (16 December 1882 – 13 June 1963) was a Norwegian rowing coxswain who competed in the 1912 Summer Olympics.

He coxed the Norwegian boat that won the bronze medal in the coxed four, inriggers.

References

External links
profile

1882 births
1963 deaths
Norwegian male rowers
Olympic rowers of Norway
Rowers at the 1912 Summer Olympics
Olympic bronze medalists for Norway
Olympic medalists in rowing
Medalists at the 1912 Summer Olympics
Coxswains (rowing)